Horlick Ice Stream is a large ice stream on the featureless ice surface to the north of the main mass of the Horlick Mountains of Antarctica, draining west-southwestward, parallel to these mountains, to enter the lower portion of the Reedy Glacier. It was mapped by the U.S. Geological Survey from surveys and U.S. Navy air photos, 1960–64, and was named by the Advisory Committee on Antarctic Names in association with the Horlick Mountains.

See also
 List of glaciers in the Antarctic
 List of Antarctic ice streams
 Glaciology

References

Ice streams of Antarctica
West Antarctica